They Live by Night is a 1948 American film noir directed by Nicholas Ray, in his directorial debut, and starring Cathy O'Donnell and Farley Granger. Based on Edward Anderson's Depression-era novel Thieves Like Us, the film follows a young convict on the run who falls in love with a woman and attempts to begin a life with her.

The film opened theatrically in London in August 1948 under the title The Twisted Road, before it was released in the United States by RKO Radio Pictures as They Live by Night in November 1949. Though it received favorable reviews from film critics, it was a box-office failure, losing the studio $445,000.

Although the film is considered by many to be the prototype for the "couple on the run" genre and is generally seen as the forerunner to the movie Bonnie and Clyde, the first telling of the story was actually the 1939 Persons in Hiding, based on the J. Edgar Hoover memoir of the same title.

Robert Altman directed another adaptation of the novel using the original title of the novel, Thieves Like Us (1974).

Plot
Arthur "Bowie" Bowers, a 23-year-old serving a prison sentence for a murder he allegedly helped perpetrate at age 16, escapes from prison with two older bank robbers, Chicamaw and T-Dub. The three take shelter with Chicamaw's brother, who operates a service station, and niece, Catherine "Keechie" Mobley, who works there. Hoping to also free his incarcerated brother Richard, Chicamaw concocts a plan to rob a bank and use the funds to hire a lawyer to prove a wrongful conviction.

The robbery goes smoothly. However, shortly afterward Bowie crashes his car, and Chicamaw then kills a police officer who arrives at the scene. Chicamaw leaves an injured Bowie in the care of Keechie and joins T-Dub in another town. The sheepish Keechie swiftly grows fond of Bowie, who is also shy. The two bond over their lack of experience in the world and soon develop a romance. Meanwhile, the press reports heavily on Bowie, wrongly pinning him as the ringleader of the robbery. Bowie and Keechie decide to go on the run together, and travel by bus through several towns. Late one night, they come across a chapel that performs quickie marriages for $20. Bowie asks Keechie to marry him, to which she agrees. Hawkins, the local justice of the peace, performs the ceremony and sells the couple a convertible car.

The couple travel to a remote mountain resort where Keechie once stayed during her childhood, and rent a cabin there, dreaming about being able to live openly together. At Christmastime, Chicamaw arrives at the resort, having tracked the couple there; he has gambled away his money and wants Bowie to help him and T-Dub commit another robbery. Bowie reluctantly agrees, though Keechie, fearing Bowie will not make it out alive, gives him his Christmas gift early: a wristwatch. The three men commit another robbery, but T-Dub is killed during it. Bowie and Chicamaw flee the scene by car. While driving, Bowie learns from a drunken Chicamaw that he is jealous of all the press attention Bowie and Keechie have received. Bowie eventually forces Chicamaw out of the car at gunpoint.

When Bowie returns to the resort, he learns from Keechie that Chicamaw was killed in a liquor store robbery. In radio broadcasts, Bowie is again described as the ringleader of the robbery. In a heated conversation, Keechie reveals she is pregnant. The couple depart the resort and head east, traveling mainly at night so as not to be seen. Relenting on their secrecy, they decide to spend a leisurely time in public, visiting a park, and then a nightclub. In the club, Bowie is recognized by a gangster, causing the couple to flee again. Bowie suggests they escape to Mexico, to which Keechie agrees.

En route, Keechie grows ill, and the couple seek refuge at a motel owned by Mattie, T-Dub's sister-in-law. Mattie reluctantly allows them to stay. Bowie visits Hawkins, hoping he can help him and Keechie cross the border, while Mattie makes a deal with police that she will turn over Bowie in exchange for Richard's release. When Hawkins tells Bowie he is unable to help him, a bereft Bowie returns to the motel and informs Mattie he is going to leave by himself to ensure the safety of Keechie and their unborn child. Mattie encourages Bowie to say a final goodbye to Keechie. He agrees and writes a farewell letter to bring to her. As he is about to enter the cabin, police unexpectedly descend on the scene, provoking Bowie to draw a gun. The police shoot him to death. Keechie, kneeling over Bowie's dead body, reads the farewell letter he wrote for her.

Cast

Production

Development
The novel Thieves Like Us by Edward Anderson had been bought by RKO in 1941 for $10,000. After numerous writers tried to make a screenplay out of it, nothing became of it. According to producer John Houseman, "I found the book and gave it to Nick to read, and he fell madly in love with it–as indeed I did, but Nick particularly was very familiar with that territory. He'd been there when he worked with the Lomaxes, he'd been there when he worked for the Department of Agriculture, and so on. And that whole Depression stuff was terribly his stuff. So he sat down and wrote the treatment. I'd come home at night and we'd go over it; I'd edit it a little, that's all, and it was very, very good." Houseman would repeatedly send in treatments, fronting for the novice Ray. Houseman, who had considerable authority as a producer, was aware of Ray's passion for the project and there was never any doubt that Ray would direct the film.

Much to the dismay of Ray and Houseman, RKO saw no commercial value in the story, especially because Ray had had no film directing experience. In early 1947, producer Dore Schary became production chief over RKO with hopes of turning it into Hollywood's most adventurous studio. Schary became known for his liberal values and for giving novice directors the chance to make their debuts. Schary read Ray's treatment and on February 10, Ray signed a contract to RKO with a note by Schary specifying that "It is the intention to have him direct his first project Thieves Like Us."

Houseman hired Charles Schnee to write the screenplay but he was concerned that he wouldn't alter Ray's treatment. Ray and Schnee worked together to make the treatment into a true script without any problems and a completed script was submitted to RKO in May 1947.

Casting
Farley Granger recounted that he was at Saul and Ethel Chaplin's house for a party. Ray had also been invited and just sat and drank and stared at Granger. Granger asked Ethel Chaplin about Ray's behavior, and she replied that Ray was in the middle of casting his first movie and had taken a professional interest in Granger. Houseman arranged to have Granger test for RKO, which went very well; Ray was determined that he had found his Bowie and then asked Granger if there was an actress whom he felt comfortable with. Granger replied with Cathy O'Donnell, who was also brought in to make a test.

Both Granger and O'Donnell were under contract to Samuel Goldwyn and had limited acting experience behind them, Granger had been in two films before being drafted for World War II while O'Donnell had just made the classic The Best Years of Our Lives (1946) but Ray was fiercely loyal and fought for both of them. Granger later said that "[Ray] and John Houseman were among the few people who fought for me in my career. They said no, we will not make the film without him. When Nick believed in you, he was very loyal." In his autobiography, Granger lists They Live by Night as one of his two or three favorite films.

Many of the supporting cast and minor characters were played by friends of Houseman and Ray, although RKO contract player Robert Mitchum expressed interest in playing Chicamaw, saying that like Ray he knew all about the Depression-era South and had once been in a chain gang. Mitchum went so far as to shave his head and dye it black for the role (in the original novel Chicamaw is an Indian), but because Mitchum was a rising star and had recently received an Oscar nomination, the role of a bank robber was deemed unfit for him. He and Ray did end up working together on projects, including The Lusty Men. The role of Chicamaw went to Howard Da Silva, who had made an impression in Marc Blitzstein's musical The Cradle Will Rock (1937), produced by Houseman. In portraying Chicamaw, De Silva wears a white eye cover to give the impression that he is blind in his right eye. Chicamaw's blind eye is not present in Anderson's novel. Other minor roles were played by people Ray knew from his time in the New York theater, including Marie Bryant from Beggar's Holiday (the nightclub singer singing Your Red Wagon), Curt Conway (the man in the tuxedo at the night club) and Will Lee (the jeweler).  Byron Foulger appears as the owner of the cabin where the couple try to hide out.

Filming
On June 23, 1947, Ray began shooting his first film. The first scene shot was the opening scene, a tracking shot of Bowie, T-Dub and Chickamaw escaping from prison in a stolen car. Ray decided to use a helicopter, which had previously been used for establishing shots of landscapes, but never before had it been used to shoot action. This film is sometimes considered the first to use a helicopter for this purpose and predates James Wong Howe's celebrated final shot for Picnic by eight years. Four takes were required, with the second one being in the final cut.

For the rest of the day Ray used the helicopter for other scenes of the movie. Making They Live by Night under Houseman and Schary's guidance remained probably the only time in Ray's career when he had complete creative control and not unlike Orson Welles's debut Citizen Kane (1941), also made at RKO for Houseman, Ray experimented with sound and cinematography. Ray's biographer notes that "Only Welles similarly tried to define acoustic and even verbal textures as much as the visual." Renowned film editor Sherman Todd also urged Ray to experiment and break rules.  Exteriors were filmed both on location and at RKO's movie ranch in Encino but Todd blended sequences so well together that audiences didn't notice the difference.

Filming completed in October 1947. Despite an excellent preview, the studio didn't know how to market the film and Howard Hughes's takeover of RKO exacerbated the situation. Hughes shelved the film for two years, before releasing it to a single theater in the UK to enthusiastic reviews (one such rave review came from Gavin Lambert, who eventually became a screenwriter for Ray) and it was finally released in the US in November 1949 under the title They Live by Night, after being changed from Thieves Like Us (the source novel's name), The Twisted Road, I'm a Stranger Here Myself and Your Red Wagon. The title, chosen from an audience poll, was favored by Hughes.

During those two years, many wealthy persons involved in the entertainment industry of Hollywood had screening rooms and viewed the film, which led to further employment of its cast and crew, Alfred Hitchcock cast Farley Granger in Rope (1948) upon seeing this film and Humphrey Bogart, greatly impressed by Ray's direction, hired him to direct his independent production Knock on Any Door (1949) at Columbia Pictures.

John Houseman later looked back on the film with affection: "Now [1973] it's being rediscovered and being called all sorts of beautiful things, but at the time it died a horrible death....I had great success in Hollywood, but somehow you always have a special feeling for your sick children—in my case, 'They Live by Night' and 'All Fall Down'."

Release

Box office
The film recorded a loss of $445,000.

Critical response
When the film was released, film critic Bosley Crowther gave the film a positive review, writing, "A commonplace little story about a young escaped convict 'on the lam' and his romance with a nice girl whom he picks up and marries is told with pictorial sincerity and uncommon emotional thrust in RKO's latest item, They Live by Night, at the Criterion. Although it—like others—is misguided in its sympathies for a youthful crook, this crime-and-compassion melodrama has the virtues of vigor and restraint ... They Live by Night has the failing of waxing sentimental over crime, but it manages to generate interest with its crisp dramatic movement and clear-cut types."

Home media
The film was issued on Blu-ray and DVD by the Criterion Collection in August 2017.

References

External links

 
 
 
 
 Collection of reviews on the film at Indiewire
 2002 Article on film at Senses of Cinema
They Live by Night: Dream Journey an essay by Bernard Eisenschitz at the Criterion Collection

1949 films
1949 directorial debut films
1940s crime drama films
American black-and-white films
American crime drama films
1940s English-language films
Film noir
Films about bank robbery
Films based on American novels
Films directed by Nicholas Ray
Films scored by Leigh Harline
Films shot in Los Angeles
RKO Pictures films
1948 drama films
1948 films
1949 drama films
1940s American films